Earnest Cox may refer to:
Earnest Sevier Cox (1880–1966), American Methodist preacher and racist
 Earnest Stewart Cox (1900–1992), British railway engineer and author

See also
Ernest Cox (1883–1959), British engineer